Dexter High School (DHS) is a public high school located in Dexter, Michigan, serving grades 9-12. Melanie Nowak is the school's current principal. Dexter High School is one of only two schools in the United States with a dreadnaught as a mascot, the other being Lakeland Senior High School in Florida.

History
Dexter High School was originally located in the building which is now Creekside Intermediate School. When the population of students became too large for this building, the new Dexter High School was built in 2002 in its current location.

Academics

Dexter High School offers ten different AP courses (nine with two alternating each year) and 19 IB courses. Dexter High School also houses more than 30 clubs for students to participate in. DHS also has musical departments including Band, Orchestra, and most recently, choir.

The Dexter High School National Ocean Science Bowl team took 2nd place nationally in 2015.

Dexter High School had a 4-year high school graduation rate of 99% as of 2020.

Extracurricular activities

Athletics
The Dexter Dreadnaughts compete in the SEC. The school colors are maroon, white, and gold. Dexter offers the following MHSAA sanctioned varsity sports:

Baseball (boys)
Basketball (girls & boys)
Competitive cheer (girls)
Cross country (girls & boys)
Football (boys)
Golf (girls & boys)
Ice hockey (boys)
Lacrosse (girls & boys)
Soccer (girls & boys)
Softball (girls)
Swim and dive (girls & boys)
Tennis (girls & boys)
Track and field (girls & boys)
Volleyball (girls)
Wrestling (boys)

References

External links
 
 School district website

Public high schools in Michigan
Educational institutions established in 2002
Schools in Washtenaw County, Michigan
2002 establishments in Michigan